The 1991 Refuge Assurance Cup was the fourth and last competing of the Refuge Assurance Cup, for the most successful teams in the Sunday League. It was an English limited overs county cricket tournament which was held between 1 and 15 September 1991. The tournament was won by Worcestershire who defeated Lancashire by 7 runs in the final at Old Trafford, Manchester.

Format
The cup was an end-of-season affair. The counties finishing in the top four of the 1991 Refuge Assurance League competed in the semi-finals. The top two teams were drawn at home. Winners from the semi-finals then went on to the final at Old Trafford, Manchester, which was held on 15 September 1991.

Semi-finals

Final

The attendance at the final was 9,025.

References

CricketArchive tournament page 

Pro40
Refuge